Rael Kedam is the great central dividing ridge on the island of Babeldaob, in Palau. Most states on the island are bordered with this steep and high range.

Landforms of Palau
Ridges
Landforms of Oceania